Joseph LoPiccolo may refer to:

Joseph LoPiccolo (organized crime) (1918–1999), American Gambino crime family member
Joseph LoPiccolo (psychology) (born 1943), American psychologist
Joe LoPiccolo, American musician who covered Joan Osborne's "One of Us"